Ali Bagheri Kani (born October 1967 in Kan, Tehran) is an Iranian diplomat who is the current political deputy at the Ministry of Foreign Affairs of Iran, since September 2021.

He was Deputy Secretary of Iran's Supreme National Security Council from 2007 to 2013 and currently serves as advisor at the council. He was also chairman of Saeed Jalili's presidential campaign in 2013 presidential election. He is the son of Mohammad-Bagher Bagheri, a former member of the Assembly of Experts and also nephew of Mohammad-Reza Mahdavi Kani. He has been a diplomat since 1990.

References

1967 births
Living people
Politicians from Tehran
Iranian nuclear negotiators
Iranian campaign managers